The Coppa d'Oro, also known as “ one lira” Race and Grand Prix of the Italian Sport Directors, is a male road race of cycling addressed to the junior athletes. It takes place every September in the village of Borgo Valsugana (Trentino). The race starts in Borgo Valsugana. It follows the county road 228 and crosses the villages of Roncegno Terme, Novaledo and Levico Terme. After that, it climbs the hill of Tenna, then it goes down to Pergine Valsugana and comes back to Borgo Valsugana on the same course. At the end of the race the athletes ride the uphill from Scurelle to Telve two times, to arrive finally in the centre of Borgo Valsugana, after 81,2 km.

History
The race was planned and organized for the first time in 1965 by Carlo Dalla Torre. The first three editions took place in the cities of Avio, Preore and Trento. The race established definitively in Borgo Valsugana in 1968. The editions of 1969, 1976 and 1977 didn’t take place.
The final prize is presented to the Team-manager of the winning cyclist. In the past the prize was 1 lira coin but this symbolic reward has recently been replaced with cash prizes. There’s not only the cadets’ race. From 1997 there is also the Coppetta d'Oro, a race for the youngest athletes at the sport Centre of Borgo Valsugana. In 2000 it was added the Coppa Rosa, a race for female cadets that takes place the day before the Coppa d'Oro. It follows a 50 km course from Borgo Valsugana to the limit of the Veneto Region and comes back. Lastly, from 2007 the event includes all the young cycling categories from 7 to 16 years with the Coppa di Sera, a race for male and female beginners that follows an inner course in Borgo Valsugana.
Up to now, the only athlete who won two editions of the Coppa d'Oro is Diego Ulissi, in 2004 and 2005.

Coppa d'Oro's winners

External links
 Official website (English)
 Results Coppa d'Oro 2012, TrentoToday 
 Matic Safaric, first non Italian winner of Coppa d'Oro 
Race on local tourism page 

Cycle races in Italy
Sport in Trentino
1965 establishments in Italy
Recurring sporting events established in 1965